Clorindo Manuel José Testa  (December 10, 1923 – April 11, 2013) was an Italian-Argentine architect and artist.

Testa was one of the leaders of the Argentine rationalist movement and one of the pioneers of the brutalist movement in Argentina. His style as an architect has always been influenced by his artistic nature, with projects dominated by the effects of colour, tension, metaphors and plasticity; these aspects are well illustrated in his designs for the Biblioteca Nacional de la República Argentina and the Banco de Londres building in Buenos Aires. He was member of the international jury which chose Carlos Ott as the architect for the Opera Bastille in Paris.

Testa won the Konex Award, the most prestigious award for visual arts in Argentina, in 1982, 1992 and 2012. He died, aged 89, in Buenos Aires, Argentina.

Early life
Testa was born in Benevento near Naples, Italy. He graduated from the Faculty of Architecture at the Universidad de Buenos Aires in 1948. Testa came to architecture via naval engineering and then civil engineering. After a two year stay in Europe he also became an excellent painter.

Principal projects

1950–1959 
Cámara Argentina de la Construcción
Centro Vacacional Municipalidad Córdoba
Templete y Nichos Cementerio Chacarita
Centro Cívico La Pampa (Casa de Gobierno, Terminal, Cámara de Diputados, Biblioteca)
Plan Regulador Buenos Aires
Edificio Flota Fluvial del Estado

1960–1969 
Biblioteca Nacional de la República Argentina (started 1962 but not opened until the 1990s)
Instituto Di Tella
Banco de Londres y América del Sur (completed 1966)
Harrods local del Banco Londres
Casa Michel Robirosa
Pabellón Argentino Feria Del Campo Madrid
Casa Di Tella

1970–1979 
Hospital Italiano de Buenos Aires ampliación
Escuela Oficiales De La Armada Argentina
Museo Nacional Bellas Artes Montevideo, ampliación
Ba.Na.De. (National Development Bank)
Hospital Naval
Casa Carabassa
Centro Comercial Pinamar
Centro Cívico La Pampa: Palacio Legislativo
Banco Holandés Unido y Embajada Holanda
Departamentos Esmeralda 1366
Country Club “Macabi”
Edificio Calle Rodriguez Peña
Conjunto Residencial Torres Castex
Plaza Hotel
Central Hospital, Abidjan, Côte d'Ivoire.
Sanatorio Omint
Casa Lacarra
Casa Castiñheira

1980–1989 
Centro Cultural De La Ciudad De Buenos Aires
Torres Castex 1 Etapa
Aerolíneas Argentinas. Simulador De Vuelo
Torres Castex 2 Etapa
Centro Cívico Sta. Rosa ampliación
Atelier Clorindo Testa
Centro Comercial Paseo De La Recoleta
Casa Capotesta
Banco Nación Suc. Carlos Paz, Cba.
Gimnasio Paseo Infanta
La Perla Spa (Balneario La Perla)
Torres Castex 3ª Etapa
Casa La Tumbona
Local del I.C.I
Restaurante Japonés Paseo Infanta
Casa En Country Club San Diego

1990–1999 
Plaza Del Pilar- Bs. As. Design Center
Casa en Martínez
Locar para Interior Forma
Auditorio Templo S.G.I.A.R.
Caritas Guarderías y Escuelas Prototipo
Stand Feria Libro
Casa Verde
Galeria Arte Altera
Casa en barrio River Oaks- Maschwitz

2000–2009 
Casa en Stud en La Plata
Departamento Di Tella
Universidad Di Tella
Hospital Quilmes
Campus Universidad del Salvador, Auditorio
Campus Universidad de La Punta (San Luis)
C. C. Fundación Konex
Biblioteca Gobernación de La Pampa.

References

External links

 Images of his works
 Biography 
 trabajo de investigacion sobre el Centro Civico de La Pampa, por Claudia Costa Cabral y Cassandra Salton UFRGS (PT)
 Clorindo Testa on Architectuul

Architects from Buenos Aires
Argentine artists
Italian emigrants to Argentina
Italian expatriates in Argentina
Naturalized citizens of Argentina
Architects from Naples
University of Buenos Aires alumni
1923 births
2013 deaths
Burials at La Recoleta Cemetery